Acacia murrayana is a tree in the family Fabaceae.  It has numerous common names, including sandplain wattle, Murray's wattle, fire wattle, colony wattle and powder bark wattle that is endemic to arid areas in every mainland State except Victoria.

Description
It is able to form suckers and form dense colonies. It has glabrous branchlets that are often covered in a fine white powdery coating giving it frosted appearance. Like most Acacia species, it has phyllodes rather than true leaves. The glabrous and thinly coriaceous phyllodes have a linear to narrowly elliptic shape but are occasionally oblanceolate and have a minute, callous and curved mucro. The phyllodes midrib is not prominent and it has obscure lateral nerves that are longitudinally anastomosing. In Western Australia it blooms between August and November but it can flower as late as January in other places and produce profuse flower displays a seed crops in favourable conditions. The flowers are bright yellow, and held in cylindrical clusters up to eight millimetres in diameter. The spherical flower-heads are composed of 25 to 50 densely packed golden to light golden coloured flowers.

In Australia, its main flowering period is from August to November (this varies upon specific geographic) with pods maturing several months later (November-January). During favorable seasons, plants flower profusely and produce heavy pod crops.

The species most closely resembles A. pachyacra which has a similar range. The most obvious way to distinguish them is that A. pachyacra phyllodes (leaves) are much narrower.

Taxonomy
The species was first formally described by the botanist George Bentham in 1864 as part of the work Flora Australiensis. It was reclassified as Racosperma murrayanum in 1987 by Leslie Pedley then transferred back to genus Acacia in 2006.
A. murrayana resembles Acacia dietrichiana but belongs to the A. murrayana group of wattles along with Acacia gelasina, Acacia praelongata, Acacia pachyacra and Acacia subrigida. This group of wattles is allied with the Acacia victoriae and Acacia juncifolia groups.
The specific epithet honours Dr James Patrick Murray who was the collector of the type specimen as he travelled on Howitt's Expedition to Cooper Creek as the surgeon in 1862.

Distribution
It is widespread throughout Australia's arid zone, occurring on sand ridges and in disturbed areas. In Western Australia it has a scattered distribution throughout the Pilbara, Gascoyne, Mid West, northern Wheatbelt and Goldfields-Esperance regions where it is commonly situated on sandplains, sand dunes and along creek-lines growing in sandy soils. The range of the tree extends from around Shark Bay and North West Cape in the west to the east through northern South Australia and the interior of the Northern Territory to the western edge of the Great Dividing Range around Mitchell in Queensland and Narrabri in New South Wales where it is usually part of mulga or spinifex communities.

Uses
Most Acacia seeds are highly nutritious with an established history of traditional use by Aboriginal Australians. Because of this, Acacia species have been explored as a neglected and underutilized crop that could be used to improve food security in developing countries. A. murrayana has been suggested to be one of the most promising species for this purpose. Seeds contain around 26% protein, 26% carbohydrate, 32% fiber, and 9% fat and have a low glycemic index.

Seeds and gum of the plant is a food source for Central Australian Aboriginae. Seeds can be ground to make a flour that can be used as a flavoring in desserts, a nutritious supplement in breads and pastries, or for a caffeine-free coffee alternative.

The bark of all Acacia species are high in tannins, making them useful for dyeing.

Gallery

See also
List of Acacia species

References

External links

 Plants for a Future
 Catalogue of Life
 World Wide Wattle
 Useful Tropical Plants
 FloraBase
 EcoPort
 Garden.org Plant Database
 Plants of the World Online
 Encyclopedia of Life

Acacias of Western Australia
Flora of South Australia
Flora of the Northern Territory
Flora of New South Wales
murrayana
Fabales of Australia
Taxa named by Ferdinand von Mueller
Taxa named by George Bentham
Plants described in 1864